Mendoza, or Mendoza Grande, is a village or populated centre in the Florida Department of southern-central Uruguay.

Geography
The stream Arroyo Pelado (tributary of Arroyo Mendoza) flows east of the village.

Population
In 2011 Mendoza had a population of 730.
 
Source: Instituto Nacional de Estadística de Uruguay

References

External links
INE map of Mendoza

Populated places in the Florida Department